Léon Auguste Théophile Rom (1859–1924) was a Belgian soldier and colonial official who became prominent in the administration of the Congo Free State during the late 19th century.

Career
Léon Rom was born to a poor family in Mons, Belgium, in 1859 and entered the Belgian Army at the age of 16. He subsequently worked as a customs official before leaving Belgium for the new Congo Free State in 1886 as one of the few hundred whites working in the colony's administration.

Receiving a series of rapid promotions, Rom commanded the station at Stanley Falls (now Boyoma Falls) and was eventually promoted District Commissioner of Matadi. He later transferred to the colonial military, the Force Publique, where he served as a captain. He was praised for his conduct during the Congo Arab War (1892–94) in which he personally negotiated the surrender of an Arab stronghold. After retiring from the Force Publique, he worked as an official for the Compagnie du Kasai in central Congo.

Rom became most famous for the alleged brutality of his administration in the Stanley Falls area. According to contemporary reports from white missionaries, Rom had used the severed heads of 21 Congolese to decorate the flower beds of his house at Stanley Falls. He is also said to have kept a gallows permanently in place at his station. As the literary scholar Peter Edgerly Firchow argued, however, displaying severed heads was not unusual in contemporary Central African society:

Still working for the Compagnie du Kasai, Rom died in Brussels in 1924.

In popular culture
It has been argued that Rom served as the inspiration for the character of Mr. Kurtz, an ivory trader who features prominently in Joseph Conrad's 1899 novella Heart of Darkness. Among those who have made this argument are Adam Hochschild who argued in King Leopold's Ghost that Rom and Conrad may have met in 1890. Other scholars have rejected this.

Rom notably features as the main antagonist in the 2016 film The Legend of Tarzan, in which he is portrayed by the Austrian actor Christoph Waltz.

See also

 Atrocities in the Congo Free State

Notes

Bibliography

External links
ROM (Léon Auguste Théophile) at the Biographie Coloniale Belge (1951)
 Archive Léon Rom, Royal Museum for Central Africa

1859 births
1924 deaths
People from Mons
19th-century Belgian military personnel
Congo Free State officials
Genocides in Africa
Human rights abuses in the Democratic Republic of the Congo
Human trophy collecting
Officers of the Force Publique
Scandals in Belgium